Redakai: Conquer the Kairu, also known simply as Redakai, is an animated series that premiered on YTV in Canada on July 9, 2011, on Cartoon Network in the United States on July 16, 2011 and on Canal J and Gulli in France on October 22, 2011. The series was created by Vincent Chalvon Demersay and David Michel and was co-produced by Canada's Spin Master Entertainment and France's Marathon Media in association with Canal J and Gulli. Like Totally Spies! and Martin Mystery, which were also produced by Marathon, the show's animation style has been compared to that of anime.

Premise
The series revolves around Ky, a 15-year-old student of ancient martial arts, who embarks on an epic quest to find the Kairu, a primordial alien energy source. Aided by his friends Maya and Boomer, Ky travels the world searching for the Kairu while attempting to make sure that his extraterrestrial teenage alien adversaries don’t find it first.

Studios 

 Marathon Media
 Spin Master Entertainment

Creators 

 Vincent Chalvon Demersay
 David Michel
 Stephane Berry
 Olivier Jongerlynck

Voices

French 

 Donald Reignoux
 Marie Nonnenmacher
 Bruno Meyere
 Martin Hylander Brucker
 Frederic Souterelle
 Marc Bretonnière
 Tony Marot
 Caroline Mozzone
 Stéphane Miquel
 Jessie Lambotte

English 

 Austin Di Iulio
 Jasmine Richards
 Dan Petronijevic
 Cory Doran
 Dwayne Hill
 Jamie Watson
 Lyon Smith
 Katie Griffin
 Jeff Margolis
 Teagan Moss
 Athena Karkanis
 Jason Barr
 Wil Wheaton

Episodes

Characters

Team Stax
 Ky Stax
 Maya
 Boomer

Allies
 Master Boaddai
Connor Stax
 Mookee

Villains
 Lokar

Team Radikor
 Zane
 Zair
 Techris

Team Imperiaz
 Princess Diara
 Koz
 Teeny

Team Battacor
 Zylus
 Rynoh
 Bash

References

External links 
 

2011 French television series debuts
2013 French television series endings
2010s French animated television series
2011 Canadian television series debuts
2013 Canadian television series endings
2010s Canadian animated television series
2010s Canadian science fiction television series
Canadian children's animated action television series
Canadian children's animated adventure television series
Canadian children's animated science fantasy television series
French children's animated action television series
French children's animated adventure television series
French children's animated science fantasy television series
Anime-influenced Western animated television series
YTV (Canadian TV channel) original programming
Teen animated television series
Television series by Banijay